The Uluguru mountain grasshopper (Cyphocerastis uluguruensis) is a rare species of grasshopper in the family Acrididae. The species is endemic to Uluguru Mountains of Tanzania, and is critically endangered due to a decline of its habitat.

References

Insects described in 1987
Acrididae